In taxonomy, the Thermofilaceae are a family of the Thermoproteales.

References

Further reading

Scientific journals

Scientific books

Scientific databases

External links

Archaea taxonomic families
Thermoproteota